Max "Xam" Abegglen (11 April 1902 – 25 August 1970) was a Swiss footballer who played as a forward. Throughout his career, he played for FC Lausanne until 1923 when he transferred to Grasshopper Zurich. He was the brother of André 'Trello' Abegglen and Jean Abegglen, both also players of the Swiss national team.

Abegglen played for the Switzerland national team 68 times, scoring 34 goals. He was the sole leading goalscorer for the team until Kubilay Türkyilmaz's 34th goal in his 62nd and final international in 2001. Their records were broken on 30 May 2008 with Alexander Frei's 35th goal.

Abegglen scored a hat-trick in his first international, against the Netherlands in Bern on 19 November 1922. His only other hat-trick was in the Football at the 1924 Summer Olympics on 24 May 1924, with three in a 9–0 win over Lithuania.
 The Swiss won the silver medal after losing the final 3–0 to Uruguay. Abegglen missed the 1934 FIFA World Cup. In his final match, he was captain as Switzerland lost 1–0 to Nazi Germany on 2 May 1937.

The club Neuchâtel Xamax, twice Swiss champions in the 1980s, is named after "Xam" Max Abegglen. He also competed at the 1924 Summer Olympics and the 1928 Summer Olympics.

References

External links
 Max "Xam" Abegglen – Goals in International Matches, by Erik Garin and Roberto Mamrud, RSSSF.
 
 

1902 births
1970 deaths
Swiss men's footballers
Switzerland international footballers
Footballers at the 1924 Summer Olympics
Footballers at the 1928 Summer Olympics
Olympic footballers of Switzerland
Olympic silver medalists for Switzerland
Grasshopper Club Zürich players
FC Lausanne-Sport players
Olympic medalists in football
Medalists at the 1924 Summer Olympics
Association football forwards
People from Neuchâtel
Sportspeople from the canton of Neuchâtel